St Peter Hungate, Norwich is a Grade I listed redundant parish church in the Church of England in Norwich.

History

The church is medieval. The date of 1460, representing rededication by the Paston Family, may appear on the North doorway.

After closure, in 1929, the church was converted to a Museum of Ecclesiastical Art (1932), later renamed Hungate Museum of Church Art. The museum closed in 1995, and the church passed into the care of Norwich Historic Churches Trust. It is now occupied by 'Hungate' a centre for Medieval Art.

Organ

The museum purchased a positive organ in 1938 from a monastery at Lucca, near Florence in Italy. A specification of the organ can be found on the National Pipe Organ Register.

References

Saint Peter
15th-century church buildings in England
Grade I listed buildings in Norfolk